Queen Saovabha Phongsri (RTGS: Saowapha Phongsi (Pronunciation)) was an agnatic half-sister and queen of King Chulalongkorn (Rama V) of Thailand, and mother of both King Vajiravudh (Rama VI) and King Prajadhipok (Rama VII). As in accordance with Thai royal tradition, King Vajiravudh later bestowed on his mother the title of "Queen Mother Sri Bajrindra".

Life 
Saovabha was born as a Princess of Siam to King Mongkut (or Rama IV) and Princess Consort Piyamavadi (Piam Sucharitakul). She was the youngest sister of the future Queen Sunandha Kumariratana and Queen Savang Vadhana. Saovabha became the consort of her half-brother King Chulalongkorn sometime in 1878. She gave him 9 children, 5 would survive to adulthood (one died in infancy), two would eventually become King of Siam.

In 1897, Queen Saovabha became the first female Regent of Siam, when her husband went on a tour of Europe. When he returned he bestowed upon her the title of "Somdet Phra Nang Chao Saowapha Phongsi Praborommarachininat" (RTGS) (roughly equivalent to H.M. the Queen Regent). During her time as queen, she took many interests, especially in the issues concerning women. In 1904 she established one of the first schools for girls in Siam; the "Rajini School" or Queen's School in Bangkok.

When she died in 1919 at the age of 58, she was given a grand Royal Funeral, attended by all members of the Siamese Royal Family, and the ceremony was presided over by her son King Vajiravudh. She played a prominent posthumous role in the 1924 Palace Law of Succession, in which her son King Vajiravudh stipulated that her children would take precedent among all others over the line of succession. This guaranteed the accession of her youngest son Prince Prajadhipok to the throne in 1925, despite there being more senior and learned sons of Chulalongkorn. The Queen Saovabha Memorial Institute was named after her.

Children 
She had 9 children with King Chulalongkorn:

In addition, the queen also adopted one of Savang Vadhana's daughters, Princess Valaya Alongkorn and raised as her own daughter.

Ancestors

See also 
 1924 Palace Law of Succession
 Savang Vadhana
 Chulalongkorn
 Vajiravudh
 Prajadhipok

External links 
 The Thai Redcross Society (English)
 The Queen Saovabha Memorial Institute

|-

1863 births
1955 deaths
Queen mothers
Regents of Thailand
Thai monarchy
Thai queens consort
Daughters of kings